Avenir Centre is an indoor arena in Moncton, New Brunswick. Opened in September 2018, it serves as the home to the Moncton Wildcats of the Quebec Major Junior Hockey League.

History
Proposed as a replacement for the Moncton Coliseum, the arena was approved in the spring of 2014 by the Moncton City Council on an 8–3 vote. Groundbreaking took place in the spring of 2016, with a planned opening in the fall of 2017. That date was pushed back a year. SMG would serve as operator of the new arena. Naming rights to the arena were acquired by Avenir Hearing—a New Brunswick-based chain of hearing clinics, naming it Avenir Centre; the company sponsors the distribution of free earplugs at events.

Avenir Centre's first event—a concert by country singer Keith Urban on the Graffiti U World Tour—was held on September 12, 2018. The Moncton Wildcats played their first home game at the arena on September 28, 2018, beating the Saint John Sea Dogs 5–2.

Notable events 
Avenir Centre hosted UFC Fight Night: Volkan vs. Smith on October 27, 2018, marking the first UFC mixed martial arts event to be held in New Brunswick.

It co-hosted the 2023 World Junior Ice Hockey Championships with Scotiabank Centre in Halifax.

References

External links
Official website
Official website in French

2018 establishments in New Brunswick
Music venues in New Brunswick
Quebec Major Junior Hockey League arenas
Sports venues completed in 2018
Sports venues in Moncton
Indoor arenas in New Brunswick